Judge Rogers may refer to:

Henry Wade Rogers (1853–1926), judge of the United States Court of Appeals for the Second Circuit
John Henry Rogers (1879–1967), judge of the United States District Court for the Western District of Virginia
John M. Rogers (born 1948), judge of the United States Court of Appeals for the Sixth Circuit
Judith W. Rogers (born 1939), judge of the United States Court of Appeals for the District of Columbia Circuit
Richard Dean Rogers (1921–2016), judge of the United States District Court for the District of Kansas
Waldo Henry Rogers (1908–1964), judge of the United States District Court for the District of New Mexico
Yvonne Gonzalez Rogers (born 1965), judge of the District Court for the Northern District of California

See also
M. Casey Rodgers (born 1964), judge of the United States District Court for the Northern District of Florida
Justice Rogers (disambiguation)